Roerich is a surname. People with that name include:
 Nicholas Roerich (1874–1947), Russian painter, writer, archaeologist and theosophist
 Helena Roerich (1879–1955), Russian philosopher, writer and public figure, wife of Nicholas Roerich
 George de Roerich (born Yuri Roerich) (1902–1960), Russian Tibetologist, son of Nicholas Roerich 
 Svetoslav Roerich (1904–1993), Russian painter, son of Nicholas Roerich

See also 
 Röhrich
 4426 Roerich, a main-belt asteroid
 Nicholas Roerich Museum, a museum in New York City dedicated to the works of Nicholas Roerich
 Roerich Pact, an international treaty on the protection of artistic and scientific institutions and historic monuments
 Rerikhism, a spiritual and cultural movement centered on the teachings transmitted by Helena and Nicholas Roerich